Micha Marah (born 26 September 1953) is a Belgian singer and actress. She represented Belgium at the Eurovision Song Contest in 1979 with the song "Hey Nana".

Filmography
 Avondspelen (1971) TV movie as Marleen
 Canzonissima (1963) TV Series as Zangeres

External links

1953 births
Living people
Eurovision Song Contest entrants for Belgium
Eurovision Song Contest entrants of 1979
People from Turnhout
20th-century Belgian women singers
20th-century Belgian singers
20th-century Belgian actresses
21st-century Belgian women singers
21st-century Belgian singers
Belgian television actresses